The 1994–95 Idaho Vandals men's basketball team represented the University of Idaho during the 1994–95 NCAA Division I men's basketball season. Members of the Big Sky Conference, the Vandals were led by second-year head coach Joe Cravens and played their home games on campus at the Kibbie Dome in Moscow, Idaho.

At the conference tournament in Ogden, Utah, the Vandals were defeated by third-seed Montana State in the opening  the first time since 1986 that Idaho failed to reach the semifinals.

Postseason results

|-
!colspan=6 style=| Big Sky tournament

References

External links
Sports Reference – Idaho Vandals: 1994–95 basketball season
Gem of the Mountains: 1995 University of Idaho yearbook – 1994–95 basketball season
Idaho Argonaut – student newspaper – 1995 editions

Idaho Vandals men's basketball seasons
Idaho
Idaho
Idaho